Coleophora rudella is a moth of the family Coleophoridae. It is found in southern France, Spain, the Baleares, Sardinia, Italy and Romania.

The larvae feed on Anthyllis cytisoides. They create a laterally compressed composite leaf case, consisting of three to five leaflets that have been mined out. The rear end is bivalved, strongly narrowed and bent downwards. The mouth opening is shifted about 30° to one side.

References

rudella
Moths of Europe
Moths described in 1944